Edificio Olympo is a skyscraper in the city of Santa Cruz on the Tenerife, Canary Islands, Spain. Completed in 1975, has 19 floors and rises 57 meters. Lies on the Plaza de la Candelaria 1, near some other skyscrapers, including Torres de Santa Cruz and Rascacielos de la avenida Tres de Mayo. It has an innovative and distinctive look. Main usage: offices, residential and shopping center.

See also 
 List of tallest buildings in Canary Islands

References 

Buildings and structures in Santa Cruz de Tenerife
Residential skyscrapers in Spain
Commercial buildings completed in 1975
Retail buildings in Spain
Skyscraper office buildings in Spain